IQnovate is an Australian life sciences organization that provides intellectual property asset management services and scientific advice to the biopharmaceutical industry. The company is best known for providing services to government organizations and some of the world's largest biopharmaceutical organizations. IQnovate is listed on the National Stock Exchange of Australia under the ticker symbol IQN and on the OTC in New York under the symbol IQNDY.

IQnovate is headquartered in Sydney, Australia, and George Syrmalis is the company's current CEO.

History

IQnovate was founded by George Syrmalis. George Syrmalis created the  company to provide pharmaceutical, biotechnology, medical device companies, financial institutions and academic and government organizations with advanced asset management and scientific advisory services. At the time of its founding, IQnovate was the only company in Australia providing such services.

IQnovate has been listed on Australian Securities Exchange since December 2011. At its IPO, the company had a market capitalization of $9.74 million.

Services

IQnovate's primary services include intellectual property asset management and consultation on scientific matters to members of the biopharmaceutical industry. The company also provides advisory services to financial institutions regarding investment strategies in the biotech sector. The company's staff consists of field-based medical science liaisons, specialty medical managers, medical communications, regulatory managers and pricing reimbursement experts.

IQnovate helps biopharmaceutical firms and other large organizations improve operational efficiency and regulatory compliance, hedge the risks associated with drug development and decrease development costs and time to market for new drugs. The company engages in all aspects of the drug life cycle, and it provides services on all relevant issues in the biopharmaceutical sector, including disease management, product launches, and medical practice guidelines.

References

External links
 Official website

Companies established in 2011
Pharmaceutical industry in Australia